Ir Ovot (Ir Obot; lit. City of Oboth) is a small village in southern Israel. Located in the northeastern Arabah, it falls under the jurisdiction of Central Arava Regional Council. It operated as a kibbutz from  1967 until the 1980s. In 2019 it had a population of 54.

It is the site of an extensive archaeological complex known as Tamar Fortress or Hatzevah Fortress which dates to the 10th century BCE (United Monarchy/First Temple period).

Geography
Ir Ovot is located south of the Dead Sea and southeast of Dimona in the Arabah valley, an arid plain located below the Negev plateau and south of the Jordan Rift Valley within the larger Great Rift Valley. The settlement abuts the Ein Hatzeva bloc of agricultural villages on the opposite side of Highway 90 near the Jordanian border, and is within the boundaries of the Tamar Regional Council.
  The community is located close to the biblical site of Tamar, and is west of Hatzeva Junction.

History
Originally the site of the Ein Husub police station during the British Mandate of Palestine, the location was captured by the Israel Defense Forces in 1948. The village of Ir Ovot was founded in 1967, in an area deserted apart from a small military base and roadside cafe on the way to Eilat. 

In 2018 Ir Ovot had 250 housing units were approved.

History of the Hatzeva Fortress

First observed and documented by Alois Musil in 1902, the Roman fortress was identified on Fritz Frank's 1932 travels in the region. In 1934, Nelson Glueck identified the location as a Nabatæan caravanserai coopted by the Romans, but the site's true significance was noted by Benjamin Mazar and Michael Avi-Yonah's 1950 discovery of sherds from the First Temple period.

The first salvage excavation took place in 1972 under Aharoni and Rudolph Cohen's direction, but much of the work was carried out by Cohen, Yigal Yisrael, and recently Tali Erickson-Gini, following the 1986 involvement of "Blossoming Rose" in partnership with the Israel Antiquities Authority, Jewish National Fund and Tamar Regional Council. Known in addition to Tamar as the Hatzeva Fortress, or alternatively identified with Solomon's Tadmor, the site has six strata which indicate Early Israelite, Nabatæan, Edomite, Roman, and Early Arab occupations. It includes a 1,000-year-old shade tree, and the largest Paliurus spina-christi in Israel.

The area was used for training crews in site conservation before their work on the Masada site.

10th century BCE
The earliest remains, dating to the Solomonic period of the 10th century BCE, resembles other contemporary Negev plateau fortresses and included period Negevite pottery. Ranging from tenth to sixth centuries BCE, Negevite was also uncovered at Tel Kadesh Barnea and :de:Tell el-Kheleifeh; it is probable that this level was  destroyed by Pharaoh Shishaq like other sites of that period.

9th–8th century BCE
The second layer consists of a very large Iron Age fortification surrounded by a casemate wall. This First Temple period building of the Kingdom of Judah is almost as large as contemporary cities such as Tel Be'er Sheva, and is four times larger than other fortified Negev cities at 10,000 square metres.

Excavation revealed a four-chambered, north-facing gate complex near the northeastern corner and three storerooms, a pair of granaries, a moat and a defensive wall. The city was possibly constructed by King Amaziah of Judah, an 8th-century BCE ruler who fortified the Judean kingdom and went to war with neighbouring Edom in the northern Arabah, or his son Uzziah whose construction of towers in the desert is mentioned by the second Book of Chronicles.

7th–6th century BCE
A third fortress from the Late First Temple period from the 7th–6th centuries BCE was found, though because only the walls' foundations remain, reconstructing the floor plan has been difficult.

A pit full of smashed clay and stone, which were reassembled into 74 cultic vessels, was also found, indicating a probable Edomite shrine. Censers, chalices, altars and human figurines were unearthed outside the fortress wall on the site's northern edge in 1993, near the foundations of a small building that seems to have been a shrine. A circular stone stamp seal discovered inside the fortress, picturing two men in long robes on either side of an altar, provides another indicator of Edomite origin. The pit recoveries dating to the end of the seventh century could possibly have been destroyed in the campaign of religious reforms spearheaded by King Josiah mentioned in Book of Kings II.

1st–4th century CE
Evidence of Roman administrative and military presence is plentiful, and the junction of the east–west Incense Road to Gaza and the north–south route to the Red Sea probably made it an economically valuable frontier outpost.

The Roman fortress' layout is similar to other imperial outposts in the region. An official Latin inscription that dates several area strongholds to the 3rd century CE was discovered on a large limestone slab at nearby Yotvata bears. Artefacts tell of probably destruction in the middle of the fourth century CE, perhaps by a 344 earthquake, though it was promptly rebuilt with improved, stone flooring and again destroyed two decades later, probably from an earthquake in 363.

A thermæ and caravanserai of the same period were also found, and is similar to the thermæ at Ashkelon and others in the nearby country. A row of rooms from an earlier, 1st century BCE to 1st century CE fortress revealed artefacts pointing to a Nabatæan occupation predating Roman annexation. Coins bearing the likeness of Nabatæan kings were found, along with storage jars and other vessels.

7th–8th century CE
A building fragment stratum from the Early Arab period was uncovered immediately beneath the ground surface, along with evidence of a farm located above the Roman thermæ's remains and below the modern structures.

References

External links
 Exploring ancient Israelite fortress: Biblical Tamar - Ir Ovot Exploring ancient Israelite fortress: Biblical Tamar - Ir Ovot
Arava.com

See also

Biblical archaeology
Incense Route - Desert Cities in the Negev
Iudaea Province
History of ancient Israel and Judah

Villages in Israel
1980s disestablishments in Israel
Ancient Israel and Judah
1967 establishments in Israel
Populated places established in 1967
Former kibbutzim
Religious Israeli communities
Iron Age sites in Israel
Populated places in Southern District (Israel)
Roman legionary fortresses in Israel
Roman fortifications in Judea
Kingdom of Israel (united monarchy)